The 1958 Texas gubernatorial election was held on November 4, 1958, to elect the governor of Texas. Incumbent Democratic Governor Price Daniel was reelected a second term, winning 88% of the vote to Republican Edwin Mayer's 12%.

Primaries

Democratic

Results

References

1958
Texas
November 1958 events in the United States
1958 Texas elections